The John R. Barnes House is a historic residence in Kaysville, Utah, United States, that is listed on the National Register of Historic Places (NRHP).

Description
The house is located at 10 South 100 West in Kaysville, Utah, United States and was built in 1869.  It was listed on theNRHP July 23, 1982.

The house is significant for its association with John R. Barnes, "the dominant economic figure in Kaysville during the late Nineteenth and early Twentieth centuries", and for reflecting his attempts "to maintain a residence fully consistent with his economic status and social position."  It was built first as a modest adobe building, then updated to a folk/vernacular plan, then expanded with a Victorian style addition.

See also

 National Register of Historic Places listings in Davis County, Utah

References

External links

Houses on the National Register of Historic Places in Utah
Victorian architecture in Utah
Houses completed in 1869
Houses in Davis County, Utah
1869 establishments in Utah Territory
National Register of Historic Places in Davis County, Utah